The men's synchronised 3 metre springboard was part of the Diving at the 2018 Commonwealth Games program. The competition was held on 13 April 2018 at Gold Coast Aquatic Centre in the Gold Coast.

Schedule
All times are AEST (UTC+10)

Format
A single round was held, with each team making six dives. Eleven judges scored each dive: three for each diver, and five for synchronisation. Only the middle score counted for each diver, with the middle three counting for synchronisation. These five scores were averaged, multiplied by 3, and multiplied by the dive's degree of difficulty to give a total dive score. The scores for each of the five dives were summed to give a final score.

Results
Results:

References

Diving at the 2018 Commonwealth Games